Jaunakaimis is a village in Kėdainiai district municipality, in Kaunas County, in central Lithuania. According to the 2011 census, the village was uninhabited. It is located by the  Jonava-Šeduva road, 2 km from Gudžiūnai. The larger part of the village is located in Dotnuva Eldership (as Jaunakaimis).

Demography

References

Villages in Kaunas County
Kėdainiai District Municipality